Zhengding, originally Zhending, is a county in southwestern Hebei Province, North China, located approximately  south of Beijing, capital of China. It is under the administration of the prefecture-level city of Shijiazhuang, the capital of the province, and has a population of 594,000. Zhengding has been an important religious center for more than 1,000 years, from at least the times of the Sui dynasty to the Qing dynasty. It is the founding place of several major schools of Chan Buddhism. However, many former religious building complexes have been severely damaged throughout history.  A noted temple is the Longxing Monastery, where the historical building ensemble has been preserved almost intact. Furthermore, four famous pagodas, each with its own architectural style, are still standing.

History

Archeological finds indicate that the area of Zhengding County has been settled since the early Neolithic Period. During the Spring and Autumn period, the capital of the Xianyu Kingdom was located in the area. Under the Han dynasty, the county was the site of Dongyuan, where the emperor Liu Bang led a siege during Chen Xi's rebellion in the early 190sBC. In the year 256 (Western Jin dynasty), the Changshan Prefecture was established in the county. In 923, during the Five Dynasties and Ten Kingdoms, the prefecture was renamed Zhengding Prefecture, which was later rearranged into the Zhengding Prefecture and Zhongshan County. Zhengding County was created during the Qing Dynasty, in 1723. In 1949, the county was subordinated to Shijiazhuang Prefecture and in 1986, it came under the jurisdiction of the City of Shijiazhuang.

President of China and General Secretary of CPC Xi Jinping was in charge of Secretary of the county Party Committee between 1983 and 1985. As a princeling, son of Xi Zhongxun, he was assigned to this rural area on his own request. He is credited with having a Qing dynasty style mansion constructed in the area for the filming of Dream of Red Mansions.

Geography and climate
It has a continental monsoon climate with four distinct seasons. The frost-free period exceeds 200 days per year.

Administrative Divisions
As of 2020, Zhengding County administers 2 subdistricts, 4 towns and 3 townships, which in turn control 174 villages and 186 natural villages.

Subdistrict:

Zhufutun, Sanlitun

Towns:
Zhengding Town,  Xin'an, Xinchengpu, Nangang (南岗镇), Quyangqiao Town

Townships:
Xipingle Township, Nanniu Township, Nanlou Township

Pagodas

Chengling Pagoda

The Chengling Pagoda (Chengling Ta) is built from gray bricks, it is also known as the Grey Pagoda. It is located in the Village of Linji to the south of Zhengding and was formerly part of the Linji Temple. The Linji Temple was built during the times of the Eastern Wei dynasty in 540. During the Tang Dynasty, it became the site where the monk Linji Yixuan founded the Linji School, one of the five schools of Chinese Chan Buddhism. Both Linji Yixuan and the Linji School derive their names from the village. The pagoda was first built in 867 to serve as a shrine for the mantle and alms bowl of Linji Yixuan. The original pagoda was ruined and replaced during 1161 to 1189 (Jin Dynasty) by the present-day structure. The present pagoda stands on a substructure known as a Sumeru Pedestal after the mythic Mount Sumeru and has an octagonal cross-section. It has nine multi-eared storeys and a total height of 33 meters. Its pedestal is richly decorated. Because it is seen as one of the birthplaces of Zen Buddhism, the Chengling Pagoda is favorite site for pilgrims and tourists from Japan.

Lingxiao Pagoda

The Lingxiao Pagoda, also known as the Wooden Pagoda, is a wood-and-brick construction, which was formerly part of Tianning Monastery, located to the west of Longxing Monastery. It was recorded to have been first built in 860 during the Tang Dynasty, it has undergone many repairs and rebuildings since then. The architectural style of the present-day pagoda was created during the Song Dynasty in 1045 and was left unchanged during later repairs. The pagoda has an octagonal floor plan, nine storeys, and a total height of 41 meters. The four lowest storeys are made from bricks decorated with wooden eaves. From the fifth storey upwards, the pagoda construction is entirely made of wood, constructed around a central pillar. While storey height continuously decreases from the bottom to the top of the pagoda, this decrease is particularly steep in the five upper wooden storeys. The pagoda carries a cast iron spire at its top as well. It is at the foot of this pagoda, that Dutch bishop Mgr. Frans Schraven (1873-1937) and his companions suffered their martyrdom in 1937, at the hands of the Japanese army, because of their refusal to hand over to the soldiers the Chinese women and girls whom had taken refuge in his compound.

Xumi Pagoda

The Xumi Pagoda, named for the mythical Mount Sumeru, also known as Summer Pagoda is part of Kaiyuan Monastery which is located to the west of Zhengding. It was erected from stone and bricks and is at 48 meters the tallest pagoda in Zhengding. The pagoda has an austere geometric design with a square floor plan set on a stone platform which is likewise square-shaped. Stones have also been used in the lower part of the first storey. The Xumi Pagoda was built during the Tang Dynasty in 636. Apart from a wooden ceiling over the first storey (of which no floorboards remain), the inside of the pagoda is hollow and there is no staircase either. Among the rather plain decorations on the outside are thirteen tiers of eaves as well as stone carvings of the Heavenly Kings at the corners of the stone platform. The pagoda is one of originally four fiducial buildings on the grounds of the Kaiyuan Monastery: Tianwang Hall in the front and Fachuan Hall (now in ruins) in the back, a bell tower (built in 540 during the Eastern Wei dynasty, renovated in 898 during the Tang Dynasty) in the east and the pagoda in the west. Today, the Monastery is largely destroyed and the Xumi pagoda stands surrounded by trees.

Hua Pagoda

The Hua Pagoda (Hua Ta, lit.: Flower Pagoda, part of Guanghui Temple, in the south of Zhengding) is a four-storey brick building with an unconventional shape and a total height of approximately 40 meters. While the lower three storeys have an octagonal floor plan, the fourth storey has a circular layout over which the walls taper towards the tip giving the storey a conical shape. On the outside, this storey is richly decorated with carvings of Buddhas, elephants, and aquatic animals. Another unusual feature of the Hua Pagoda or four small attached buildings, which are pagodas themselves and crowned with an egg-shaped tip. These were once lost but have recently been completely restored. The Hua Pagoda was first erected during the Tang Dynasty. The present-day structure dates back to a rebuilt during the time of the Jin Dynasty.

Other historical monuments
In June 2000, a gigantic bixi turtle was unearthed in Zhengding's Fuqian Street. The stone turtle, which originally must have supported a similarly giant stone tablet, is 8.4 m long, 3.2 m wide, and 2.6 m tall, and weighs 107 tons. It is estimated to be around 1200 years old. It has since been moved to Kaiyuan Temple.

Transportation
Zhengding has several important railway and road connections, namely the Beijing–Guangzhou, Shijiazhuang–Taiyuan, and Shijiazhuang–Dezhou railways, and the Beijing–Hong Kong and Macau and Qingdao–Yinchuan Expressways.

Line 1 of Shijiazhuang Metro have 4 stations in Zhengding County.

Shijiazhuang Zhengding International Airport (SJW/ZBSJ) is located in the county's northeast corner; the Zhengding Airport railway station on the new Beijing–Guangzhou–Shenzhen–Hong Kong High-Speed Railway is nearby.

References

Citations

Bibliography
 .

External links

Official government of Zhengding County government
Xumi Pagoda on china.org.cn
Lingxiao Pagoda on china.org.cn
Chengling Pagoda on china.org.cn
Hua Pagoda on cntravel.biz

 
County-level divisions of Hebei
Shijiazhuang